Qez Qabri-ye Jahan Bakhsh (also Romanized as Qez Qabrī-ye Jahān Bakhsh) is a village in Baladarband Rural District, in the Central District of Kermanshah County, Kermanshah Province, Iran. At the 2006 census, its population was 34, in 10 families.

References 

Populated places in Kermanshah County